In xeric lands, a gulch is a deep V-shaped valley formed by erosion. It may contain a small stream or dry creek bed and is usually larger in size than a gully. Sudden intense rainfall upstream may produce flash floods in the bed of the gulch.

In eastern Canada, gulch refers to:
a narrow deep cove (Newfoundland)
a narrow saltwater channel (Nova Scotia)

See also
 
 , includes gorge.

References

Erosion landforms
Fluvial landforms
Canyons and gorges
Valleys